Macrothricidae is a family of anomopods in the order Diplostraca. There are about 17 genera and at least 80 described species in Macrothricidae.

ITIS Taxonomic note:
Based on "prevailing use," as permitted under the ICZN (1999), Martin & Davis retain the traditional spelling Macrothricidae over the 'correct' spelling (Macrotrichidae).

Genera
 Acantholeberis Lilljeborg, 1853
 Bunops Birge, 1893
 Cactus Vávra, 1900
 Drepanothrix G. O. Sars, 1862
 Echinisca
 Grimaldina Richard, 1892
 Guernella Richard, 1892
 Iheringula
 Lathonura Lilljeborg, 1853
 Macrothrix Baird, 1843
 Onchobunops
 Ophryoxus G. O. Sars, 1861
 Parophryoxus Doolittle, 1909
 Pseudomoina
 Streblocerus G. O. Sars, 1862
 Wlassicsia Daday, 1904
 Wlassiscia

References

Further reading

 
 
 
 
 

Cladocera
Crustacean families